Blind Date (U.S. title: Chance Meeting) is a 1959 British murder mystery film directed by Joseph Losey and starring Hardy Krüger, Stanley Baker, and Micheline Presle. The plot is about a police inspector who investigates a woman's death, with her lover being the prime suspect. Ben Barzman and Millard Lampell were nominated for the BAFTA Award for Best British Screenplay.

The film was one of star Stanley Baker's favourites.

As there is no blind date in the storyline the title is somewhat misleading. The plot revolves around a rendezvous rather than a blind date. The title perhaps alludes to the hero being blind to the truth of his lover's background.

Plot
Jan Van Rooyer, a young Dutch artist, working in a London private art gallery, cheerfully arrives at the large mews flat owned by Jacqueline Cousteau. The door is open and he goes in and has a drink and puts on a loud jazz record. Around 20 minutes later uniformed police arrive and start questioning him. Inspector Morgan arrives soon after.

They have had a phone call from the flat and on the investigation, Jacqueline is found dead in the bedroom - so Jan has much explaining to do. He explains the relationship in a series of vignettes. They had met in the gallery and she had asked for private lessons in his studio. She tells him she is married and when she starts to model for him they also become lovers despite their age difference and very different social background.

The investigation finds little evidence of his innocence but the investigation proves that Jacqueline had more than one lover.

During the police search, Jan had pocketed an envelope of cash in the flat with his name on it. The inspector finds it and the £500 inside is concluded to be a "pay off".

However, Jacqueline rematerialises! The dead woman in the flat is a nightclub singer and not her. Jacqueline is married to a high ranking public figure: Lord Fenton. Inspector Morgan leaves the two alone together. She continues to deny knowing him. The police reveal the dead woman is her husband's mistress. The mistress was called "Jacqueline Cousteau". The wife has assumed her identity then killed her. Jan was part of her plot all along.

Cast
Hardy Krüger as Jan Van Rooyer
Stanley Baker as Inspector Morgan
Micheline Presle as "Jacqueline Cousteau" (Lady Fenton)
John Van Eyssen as Inspector Westover
Gordon Jackson as uniformed Police Sergeant
Robert Flemyng as Sir Brian Lewis
Jack MacGowran as Postman
Redmond Phillips as Police Doctor
George Roubicek as Police Constable
Lee Montague as Sergeant Farrow

Production
The script was originally written by Eric Ambler. Losey disliked it so it was rewritten. The budget consisted of £40,000 put up by the German producer and £98,000 provided by SBA. 

Virginia McKenna turned down the part of Lady Fenton. Losey wanted the part of the police officer to go to Peter O'Toole but he was not considered a name at the time so it was offered to Stanley Baker who would make several films with Losey. The film was shot from March to May 1959. 

Losey says John Davis of Rank wanted references to the corruption of the police and the class system to be removed but the filmmakers held firm and changes were not made.

Reception
Sydney Box sold the film to Paramount in the US for twice what it cost, putting it in profit. (Another source says Box sold it for its cost.) After this and the film's box office response in the UK it made a profit of £160,000.

The New York Times found the film "absorbing", noting that "Joseph Losey proves himself a strikingly adept technician with an alert and caustic personal style." Variety called it a "better than average yarn".

References

Bibliography

External links

 
 

1959 films
British black-and-white films
British mystery films
Films based on British novels
Films directed by Joseph Losey
Films scored by Richard Rodney Bennett
Films set in London
1950s English-language films
1950s British films